The Communist Party of Australia (CPA) is a communist party in Australia. It was founded in 1971 as the Socialist Party of Australia (SPA) and adopted its current name in 1996. The party was established by former members of the original Communist Party of Australia who resigned or were expelled due to internal disagreements over the Warsaw Pact invasion of Czechoslovakia and the party's adoption of Eurocommunism. The party had its first and only electoral win in 2012 when it gained a seat on the Auburn City Council, which they held until 2016.

History

Socialist Party (1971–1996)
In the late 1960s, the CPA, under the leadership of National Secretary Laurie Aarons, became a strong supporter of "Eurocommunism", of abandoning Marxism–Leninism and democratic centralism, and trying to form a "united front" of the various left-wing forces thrown up by the movement of opposition to the Vietnam War. The CPA leadership had become increasingly critical of the Soviet Union, particularly over the 1968 Warsaw Pact invasion of Czechoslovakia. Dissidents took the view that the CPA should not become a left social-democratic party, and should continue as a Marxist–Leninist party. The group was described as pro-Soviet hardliners. Their position put them at odds with the CPA leadership.

The SPA was led by a group of veteran trade union officials such as Pat Clancy and Peter Symon. Clancy resigned from the SPA in 1983, and Symon was the general secretary from its formation until his death in December 2008, a total of 36 years.

Communist Party (1996–present)
The old CPA was dissolved in 1991. The SPA, believing itself to be the rightful successor to the original CPA formed in 1920, changed its name to Communist Party of Australia at its 8th Party National Congress in October 1996.

After Symon's death, party president Hannah Middleton was elected general secretary by the 11th Party National Congress in October 2009, with Vinicio Molina succeeding Middleton as party president. Bob Briton was elected general secretary at the 12th Party Congress in 2013.

Bob Briton resigned as general secretary of the CPA in March 2019. Briton came into conflict with the central committee (CC) due to ideological differences between himself and others on the central committee, being accused of taking a defeatist position. This accusation was made after Briton attempted to work with the youth outside party structures. Briton deleted most of the party's social media outlets in response. Briton split the party and formed the Australian Communist Party alongside other former members.

On 13–14 April 2019, the Central Committee of the Communist Party of Australia elected a new leadership led by General Secretary Andrew Irving and National President Vinnie Molina.

Policies
The current CPA is a traditional Marxist–Leninist communist party whose ultimate objective is the revolutionary transformation of Australian society and the establishment of socialism in Australia. It describes its objective as being to "change the direction of politics in Australia and eventually, to replace the capitalist system with a socialist one."

The party's policies are inspired by those of Karl Marx, Friedrich Engels and Vladimir Lenin.

The party has strong, historical links to the Australian trade union movement.

The party maintains friendly relations with communist and socialist parties overseas and is a participant in the International Meeting of Communist and Workers' Parties (IMCWP).

The party's main policies are:
 The socialist reconstruction of the Australian society
 An end to privatisations of assets owned by the federal and state governments
 To free Australia from foreign transnationals
 Regulation by the Federal Government of prices, profit levels, and interest rates
 The abolition of the Goods and Services Tax
 Expansion of the public sector
 Increase in the national minimum wage
 Increase in pension, unemployment benefits
 Reduction of the working week
 Halt reductions in tariffs
 Reduction of military spending

Elections
Michael Perth contested the seat of Port Adelaide in the 1998 and in the 2001 federal elections, but polled less than 1% of the vote in both cases. Bob Briton contested the SA state seat of Lee in 2010 and polled 2.9% of the votes.

At the 2010 federal election the party endorsed a candidate for the House of Representatives seat of Sydney as part of the Communist Alliance. The party received 0.83% or 656 of the 79,377 votes cast. It also endorsed two candidates for the Senate in New South Wales, receiving 0.17% or 6,999 of the 4,333,267 votes cast. The Australian Electoral Commission deregistered Communist Alliance successor name The Communists on 22 May 2012 due to the party failing to prove it had 500 members.

The Communist Party of Australia received its first electoral win with the election of Tony Oldfield in local government elections on 8 September 2012 to Auburn City Council, New South Wales.

The Communist Party of Australia planned to run candidates in the 2016 federal election, but their registration was rejected by the Australian Electoral Commission. In 2017 the party attempted to register under the name "The Communists", but they were again rejected due to the party failing to prove it had at least 500 members.

Federal

Notes

References

External links
 
 The Guardian

1971 establishments in Australia
Communist Party of Australia (revived)
Far-left politics in Australia
Political parties established in 1971
International Meeting of Communist and Workers Parties
Marxist parties in Australia